Darvish Khak-e Bala (also Romanized as Darvīsh Khāk-e Bālā; Bālā Darvīsh Khāk and Darvīsh Khāk) is a village in Esbu Kola Rural District, in the Central District of Babol County, Mazandaran Province, Iran. At the 2006 census, its population was 668, in 161 families.

References 

Populated places in Babol County